Conigephyra is a genus of moths in the subfamily Lymantriinae. The genus was erected by Cyril Leslie Collenette in 1934.

Species
Conigephyra atrisquamata (Hampson, 1910) Gold Coast of western Africa
Conigephyra citrona (Hering, 1926) Cameroon
Conigephyra discolepia (Hampson, 1910) Sierra Leone
Conigephyra flava (Bethune-Baker, 1911) western Africa
Conigephyra leucoptera (Hering, 1926) Tanzania
Conigephyra melanchila Collenette, 1960 Congo
Conigephyra pallidula (Hering, 1926) Tanzania
Conigephyra rikatia Collenette, 1956 Mozambique
Conigephyra sericaria (Hering, 1926) Uganda
Conigephyra splendida (Hering, 1926) Tanzania
Conigephyra unipunctata (Möschler, 1887) western Africa

References

Lymantriinae